Jack Synold is an American football coach.  He was the head football coach at Carthage College located in Kenosha, Wisconsin for four seasons, from 1988 to 1991, compiling a record of 12–24.

Biography
Synold was born in Milwaukee, Wisconsin. He played tight end for the University of Wisconsin–Whitewater. After graduating, he married his girlfriend, Ellen; the couple had one child, Karen. Synold  coached at Wausau East High School in Wausau, Wisconsin. He later moved to Texas, where his daughter had moved to. He once again coached around and settled at Pantego Christian Academy, where he has been coaching for nearly a decade.

Head coaching record

College

References

Year of birth missing (living people)
Living people
American football tight ends
Carthage Firebirds football coaches
Wisconsin–Whitewater Warhawks football players
High school football coaches in Wisconsin
Sportspeople from Milwaukee
People from Whitefish Bay, Wisconsin
Coaches of American football from Wisconsin
Players of American football from Milwaukee